The 2017 Tallahassee Tennis Challenger was a professional tennis tournament played on green clay courts. It was the 18th edition of the tournament to be part of the 2017 ATP Challenger Tour. It took place in Tallahassee, Florida, United States between 24 and 29 April 2017. The  men’s singles final of the tournament was won by Blaz Rola of Slovenia, whilst the doubles title was won by Scott Lipsky and Leander Paes.

Point distribution

Singles main-draw entrants

Seeds

 1 Rankings as of April 17, 2017.

Other entrants
The following players received wildcards into the singles main draw:
  Marcos Giron
  Christian Harrison
  Bradley Klahn

The following player received entry into the singles main draw using a protected ranking:
  Alejandro González

The following players received entry from the qualifying draw:
  Andrea Arnaboldi
  Dominik Köpfer
  Blaž Rola
  Jose Statham

The following players received entry as lucky losers:
  Sekou Bangoura
  Daniel Elahi Galán

Champions

Singles

 Blaž Rola def.  Ramkumar Ramanathan 6–2, 6–7(6–8), 7–5.

Doubles

 Scott Lipsky /  Leander Paes def.  Máximo González /  Leonardo Mayer 4–6, 7–6(7–5), [10–7].

External links
Official Website

References

Tallahassee Tennis Challenger
Tallahassee Tennis Challenger
Tallahassee
Tallahassee Tennis Challenger